Zwartemeer is a village in the Netherlands and it is part of the Emmen municipality in Drenthe. It is located on the border with Germany.

History 
Zwartemeer is a linear settlement along a canal which was established in 1871 as a buckwheat settlement. The colonist were mainly from Twente and Germany and were mainly Catholic. In 1932, it was home to 2,419 people. Since 1974, a carnival is organised in Zwartemeer which attracts large crowds.

Sports 
HV Hurry-Up is a men's handball club from Zwartemeer.

Notable people 
 Jeroen Lambers (born 1980), footballer Recardo Bruins was Raised not born in Zwartemeer, Racing driver

Gallery

References

External links

Emmen, Netherlands
Populated places in Drenthe
1871 establishments in the Netherlands